Microdisney were an Irish rock band formed in Cork in 1980. They were founded and led by songwriters  Cathal Coughlan (keyboards, vocals) and Sean O'Hagan (guitar). Originally typeset as Micro Disney, the band had become Microdisney by the time they (Coughlan and O'Hagan) had relocated to London in 1983 and signed to Rough Trade Records. Between 1983 and 1986 the band recorded six Peel Sessions for BBC Radio and released their debut album for Rough Trade called Everybody Is Fantastic.

In 1985, their album The Clock Comes Down The Stairs reached number one in the UK Indie Chart, and they reached the Irish top 40 with the 1987 single "Town to Town". They were one of the few Irish bands of the 1980s to achieve international success with "Town to Town" reaching number 55 in the UK Singles Chart. This single, released by Virgin Records, was followed into the UK chart by "Gale Force Wind" in March 1988. That 1 July, days after supporting David Bowie at London's Dominion Theatre, the band split up.

O'Hagan and Coughlan formed separate bands, the High Llamas and the Fatima Mansions, respectively, with Coughlan also going on to work with Sean Hughes in Bubonique and Luke Haines as part of The North Sea Scrolls project. In 2017, a radio documentary was made about the band called Iron Fist in Velvet Glove - The Story of Microdisney by producer Paul McDermott, which was re-broadcast by Newstalk 106-108fm as part of their Documentary on Newstalk season.

In 2018, Microdisney reunited for the first time in 30 years, performing live in Dublin and London. In February 2019, they played their last shows in Dublin and Cork. The members of Microdisney were awarded an IMRO/NCH Trailblazer Award, given to "culturally important" Irish albums (in this instance, for The Clock Comes Down The Stairs) in 2018.

Discography

Albums
Studio albums
Everybody Is Fantastic (1984)
We Hate You South African Bastards! (1984)
The Clock Comes Down the Stairs (1985)
Crooked Mile (1987)
39 Minutes (1988)

Other albums
Kaught at the Kampus (1980)
The Peel Sessions Album (1989)
Big Sleeping House (1995)
Daunt Square to Elsewhere: 1982–1988 (2007)

Singles
"Hello Rascals" (1982)
"Pink Skinned Man" (1983) 
"Dolly" (1984)
In the World EP (1985)
"Birthday Girl" (1985)
"Town to Town" (1987, UK #55)
"Singer's Hampstead Home" (1987)
"Gale Force Wind" (1988, UK #98)

References

Sources
 McDermott, Paul. "Iron Fist in Velvet Glove — the story of Microdisney". Audio documentary,    Newstalk / University College Cork, 2018

Further reading
 Mark. J. Prendergast (1987) Irish Rock: Roots, Personalities, Directions. O'Brien Press. 
 Mark McAvoy (2009) Cork Rock: From Rory Gallagher to the Sultans of Ping. Mercier Press.

External links
 Microdisney entry in The Irish Punk & New Wave Discography
 Microdisney documentary podcast
 

Cathal Coughlan
Irish rock music groups
Irish alternative rock groups
Musical groups from Cork (city)
Musical groups established in 1980
Musical groups disestablished in 2019
1980 establishments in Ireland
2019 disestablishments in Ireland
Rough Trade Records artists